In the area of tax policy, Exchange of Information is a critical tool in assuring compliance with tax codes. As the economy becomes increasingly globalized taxpayers gain greater freedom to move between countries and regions. Tax authorities, however, are restrained by national borders. In order for governments to ensure the proper application of their tax laws, the free and accurate exchange of information is critical. The OECD Centre for Tax Policy and Administration works to improve flow of information in this area and establish a legal framework to facilitate it.

See also 
 Tax treaty or double tax agreements

References

International taxation
OECD